Arthur Joseph Turcotte (May 14, 1850 – November 1, 1918) was a Canadian liquor merchant and political figure in Quebec. He represented Montmorency in the House of Commons of Canada from 1892 to 1896 as a Conservative member.

He was born at Saint-Jean, Île d'Orléans, Canada East, the son of Hubert Turcotte and Virginie Blagdon. He entered business as a retailer of wines and spirits in partnership with a Mr. Prévost, later becoming a wine wholesaler on his own. Turcotte went on to serve as head of the post office at Quebec City. In 1871, he married Olivia, the daughter of Rémi-Ferdinand Rinfret. Turcotte was defeated by Joseph Israël Tarte in the 1891 federal election but won an 1892 by-election held after the results of that election were appealed. He died in Quebec City at the age of 68.

References 
 
 The storied province of Quebec : past and present. Volume IV (1931) Wood, WCH p. 258

External links
 

Members of the House of Commons of Canada from Quebec
Conservative Party of Canada (1867–1942) MPs
1850 births
1918 deaths